The 1976 San Francisco Giants season was the Giants' 94th season in Major League Baseball, their 19th season in San Francisco since their move from New York following the 1957 season, and their 17th at Candlestick Park. The team finished in fourth place in the National League West with a 74–88 record, 28 games behind the Cincinnati Reds.

Offseason

Team movement discussion
During the first half of the 1970s, attendance at cold and windy Candlestick Park plummeted, and Giants owner Horace Stoneham had faced financial hardship. Finally, in 1976, he put the team up for sale. In January 1976, Stoneham agreed to sell the team for $13.25 million to a Toronto group consisting of Labatt's Breweries of Canada, Ltd., Vulcan Assets Ltd., and Canadian Imperial Bank of Commerce. The team would begin play with the 1976 season at Toronto's Exhibition Stadium and be called the Giants. In addition, it was briefly rumored they considered a return to the New York metropolitan area, perhaps to a new baseball stadium in the New Jersey Meadowlands. Instead, Bob Lurie led a group to buy the Giants from Horace Stoneham for $8 million.

Notable transactions
 January 7, 1976: Dennis Littlejohn was drafted by the Giants in the 1st round (2nd pick) of the 1976 Major League Baseball Draft (Secondary Phase).

Regular season

Opening Day starters
 Von Joshua
 Gary Matthews
 Willie Montañez
 John Montefusco
 Bobby Murcer
 Dave Rader
 Ken Reitz
 Chris Speier
 Derrel Thomas

Season standings

Record vs. opponents

Notable transactions
 June 2, 1976: Von Joshua was purchased from the Giants by the Milwaukee Brewers.
 June 13, 1976: Willie Montañez, Craig Robinson, Mike Eden, and Jake Brown were traded by the Giants to the Atlanta Braves for Darrell Evans and Marty Perez.
 June 14, 1976: Joe Strain was signed as an amateur free agent by the Giants.
 June 21, 1976: Casey Parsons was signed as an amateur free agent by the Giants.
 September 3, 1976: Randy Elliott was signed as a free agent by the Giants.

Draft picks
 June 8, 1976: Jeff Stember was drafted by the Giants in the 26th round of the 1976 Major League Baseball Draft.

Roster

Player stats

Batting

Starters by position 
Note: Pos = Position; G = Games played; AB = At bats; H = Hits; Avg. = Batting average; HR = Home runs; RBI = Runs batted in

Other batters 
Note: G = Games played; AB = At bats; H = Hits; Avg. = Batting average; HR = Home runs; RBI = Runs batted in

Pitching

Starting pitchers 
Note: G = Games pitched; IP = Innings pitched; W = Wins; L = Losses; ERA = Earned run average; SO = Strikeouts

Other pitchers 
Note: G = Games pitched; IP = Innings pitched; W = Wins; L = Losses; ERA = Earned run average; SO = Strikeouts

Relief pitchers 
Note: G = Games pitched; W = Wins; L = Losses; SV = Saves; ERA = Earned run average; SO = Strikeouts

Award winners
All-Star Game
 John Montefusco, reserve

Farm system

LEAGUE CHAMPIONS: Great Falls

References

External links
 1976 San Francisco Giants team page at Baseball Reference
 1976 San Francisco Giants team page at Baseball Almanac

San Francisco Giants seasons
San Francisco Giants season
San Fran